Irvingiaceae is a family of flowering plants, consisting of 13 species in the 3 genera Allantospermum, Irvingia and Klainedoxa. Desbordesia, formerly accepted is now included in Irvingia.

The family is named for the Scottish naval surgeon, Edward George Irving.

References

 
Malpighiales families